Elov V Persson (10 July 1894 – 9 July 1970) was a Swedish comic artist. He created one of Sweden's most popular comic strips, Kronblom.

Born in Hästbo, a dispersed settlement in Hofors Municipality, Gästrikland, Elov Persson created Kronblom in 1927 and the strip was published in the magazine Vårt Hem. A year after the creation of Kronblom, Persson created another comic strip, Agust och Lotta (August and Lotta).

Persson appeared in the first film playing an unbilled cameo as himself.

Elov Persson died in Torsåker, one day before his 76th birthday. In subsequent years, his son Gunnar continued Kronblom, while Agust och Lotta was continued by his other son, Ingvar (1930–2015).

References

External links
Elov Persson at the website of Lambiek

1890s births
1970 deaths
People from Hofors Municipality
Swedish cartoonists
Swedish comics artists